The Men's Giant Slalom in the 2019 FIS Alpine Skiing World Cup involved nine events, including a parallel giant slalom. After this season, all parallel races were moved into a separate discipline.  Marcel Hirscher of Austria won three of the first four races this season and easily won the discipline for the fifth straight season, his sixth total win in this discipline, on his way to his eighth straight overall World Cup championship.

The season was interrupted by the 2019 World Ski Championships, which were held from 4–17 February in Åre, Sweden. The men's giant slalom was held on 15 February.

Standings 
 

DNS = Did Not Start
DNF1 = Did Not Finish run 1
DSQ1 = Disqualified run 1
DNQ = Did Not Qualify for run 2
DNF2 = Did Not Finish run 2
DSQ2 = Disqualified run 2

Updated at 18 March 2019 after all events.

See also
 2019 Alpine Skiing World Cup – Men's summary rankings
 2019 Alpine Skiing World Cup – Men's Overall
 2019 Alpine Skiing World Cup – Men's Downhill
 2019 Alpine Skiing World Cup – Men's Super-G
 2019 Alpine Skiing World Cup – Men's Slalom
 2019 Alpine Skiing World Cup – Men's Combined
 World Cup scoring system

References

External links
 Alpine Skiing at FIS website

Men's Giant Slalom
FIS Alpine Ski World Cup men's giant slalom discipline titles